Artjoms Rudņevs (born 13 January 1988) is a Latvian former professional footballer who played as a striker for Daugava Daugavpils in his home country, for Zalaegerszegi TE in Hungary, for Lech Poznań in Poland, and for Bundesliga clubs Hamburger SV, Hannover 96, and 1. FC Köln. At international level, he represented the Latvia national team.

Club career

Early career and ZTE

Rudņevs started his career with his local club FC Daugava in Daugavpils, where he played until February 2009, when he signed a contract with the Hungarian club Zalaegerszegi TE. However, the previous contract with Daugava was still active, so FIFA was involved in resolving the conflict. In May 2009, he made his debut in Hungary, where he played for three seasons, scoring 20 goals in 30 league matches.

Lech Poznań

In July 2010, rumors circulated that the Ekstraklasa club Lech Poznań were interested in signing him. These rumors were subsequently confirmed and Rudņevs joined the club on trial. After a successful trial at the club and after passing the medical tests, Lech started talks with ZTE regarding a permanent transfer. The clubs initially could not agree on the transfer fee and, when it was finally decided, the Polish team was unable to negotiate personal terms with Rudnevs. It seemed that the talks were over but in August, after Rudņevs had scored two goals in the season opener, Lech reopened discussions. This time talks were successful and Rudņevs signed a four-year contract with the Polish side.

2010–11 season
He scored in his debut for Lech Poznań against Widzew Łódź. He added three more goals in five consecutive matches, the last of these the winning goal on 11 September 2010. Just five days later he scored a hat-trick against Juventus in the Europa League, the first goal a coolly slotted penalty, the second a scissors kick from three yards out, and the third a long-range equalizer deep into injury time. Rudņevs stated that it was "the best match of his career so far".

By the end of the Polish Ekstraklasa season, Rudņevs managed to score 11 goals in 27 matches to finish fourth in the league. On 1 December 2010, he scored yet again against Juventus, saying afterwards that Juventus' goalkeeper Alexander Manninger was his "favourite goalkeeper to play against". The match ended 1–1, a result that allowed Lech to progress to the next round, and eliminated Juventus. In the first match against SC Braga in the last 16 of the UEFA Europa League, Rudņevs scored a goal as Lech won 1–0. However, in the second match Lech lost 0–2 and were knocked out of the Europa League. With five goals in the Europa League, Rudņevs became the fourth top scorer, sharing this achievement with four other players.

2011–12 season
By December 2011, Rudnevs was the Polish league's leading marksman, having scored 18 goals in 17 league matches. Rudņevs was named the best player of 2011 in the Ekstraklasa by the Polish Footballers' Association. Rudņevs finished the season with a league-leading 22 goals in 29 matches. On 8 May 2012, the German Bundesliga team Hamburger SV agreed on a transfer at the end of the 2011–12 season. On 11 May, the transfer was officially confirmed by both clubs.

Hamburger SV
In the 2012–13 season, Rudņevs became the first Latvian football player in the Bundesliga. Hamburger SV started the season with three consecutive losses with Rudņevs gaining only one assist. Rudņevs scored his first goal in the Bundesliga on 26 September 2012 in a 2–2 draw against Borussia Mönchengladbach. In his first season with Hamburg Rudņevs appeared in 34 league matches, scored 12 goals with four assists, finishing as Hamburg's joint top scorer alongside Son Heung-Min, who also netted 12 times. However, his form dropped, and Rudņevs lost his place in the starting eleven early in the 2013–14 Bundesliga season.

1. FC Köln
On 15 June 2016, it was announced that Rudņevs had joined 1. FC Köln on a free transfer. On 29 September 2017, the club announced it had agreed to terminate Rudnev's contract and that he would end his career.

International career
Rudņevs was first called up to the national side on 12 November 2008 for the friendly match against Estonia. He started this match in the first eleven. Rudņevs also played for the U-21 side. He was called up to the national side again in January 2010 for the friendly match against South Korea. Rudņevs started the UEFA Euro 2012 qualifying matches in the first eleven alongside Māris Verpakovskis, putting Ģirts Karlsons on the bench. On 7 October 2011, he scored his first international goal in the 2–0 victory over Malta in a Euro 2012 qualifying match.

Personal life and controversy
Rudņevs is married and has a daughter born in 2011.

Rudņevs provoked controversy in his native Latvia when he signed for Poznan and had his name printed "Rudnev" on the shirt, indicating his Russian ethnicity. He also drew the ire of his national team captain, Kaspars Gorkšs, when he stated that he would not learn the Latvian language in addition to Russian. Gorkšs wrote an open letter criticizing Rudņevs for the statement.

Career statistics

Club

International goals
Scores and results list Latvia's goal tally first, score column indicates score after each Rudņevs goal.

Honours

Club
Daugavpils Daugava
 Latvian Cup: 2008

Zalaegerszegi TE
 Hungarian Cup runner-up: 2010

Lech Poznań
 Polish Cup runner-up: 2011

International
Latvia
Baltic Cup:2016

Individual
 Best player of the Ekstraklasa by Polish Footballers' Association: 2011
 Ekstraklasa top scorer: 2011–12
 Latvian Rising Star of the Year: 2010

References

External links
 
 
 Hlsz.hu profile 
 zte.hu profile 
 

Living people
1988 births
Latvian people of Russian descent
Sportspeople from Daugavpils
Association football forwards
Latvian footballers
Latvia international footballers
FC Daugava players
Zalaegerszegi TE players
Lech Poznań players
Hamburger SV players
Hannover 96 players
1. FC Köln players
Ekstraklasa players
Bundesliga players
Latvian expatriate footballers
Expatriate footballers in Hungary
Latvian expatriate sportspeople in Hungary
Expatriate footballers in Poland
Latvian expatriate sportspeople in Poland
Expatriate footballers in Germany
Latvian expatriate sportspeople in Germany